Marcela Váchová (born 16 July 1953) is a retired Czech artistic gymnast. She won a team bronze medal at the 1970 World Championships and placed fifth on the vault. She competed at the 1972 Summer Olympics with the best individual result of 16th place on the vault.

References

External links
 

1953 births
Living people
Gymnasts at the 1972 Summer Olympics
Olympic gymnasts of Czechoslovakia
Czech female artistic gymnasts
Sportspeople from Brno